The 2015 season was Djurgårdens IF's 115th in existence, their 60th season in Allsvenskan and their 15th consecutive season in the league. They were competing in Allsvenskan, Svenska Cupen. League play started in early April and lasted until early November. Pelle Olsson made his second season as manager.

Squad information

Squad
 
 updated 14 November 2015.

|}

Transfers

In

Out

Player statistics
 Appearances for competitive matches only.

|}

Goals

Total

Allsvenskan

Svenska Cupen

Competitions

Overall

Allsvenskan

League table

Results summary

Results by round

Matches
Kickoff times are in UTC+2 unless stated otherwise.

	 
	 
	 
	 
	 
	 
	 
	 
	 
	 
	 
	 

Source:

Svenska Cupen

2014–15
The tournament continues from the 2014 season.

Kickoff times are in UTC+1.

Group stage

2015–16
The tournament continues into the 2016 season.

Qualification stage

Non competitive

Pre-season
Kickoff times are in UTC+2 unless stated otherwise.

References

Djurgårdens IF Fotboll seasons
Djurgardens IF Fotboll